Yurgulig is a rural locality (a selo) in Dzhuldzhagsky Selsoviet, Tabasaransky District, Republic of Dagestan, Russia. The population was 293 as of 2010.

Geography 
Yurgulig is located 10 km west of Khuchni (the district's administrative centre) by road. Kulif and Dzhuldzhag are the nearest rural localities.

References 

Rural localities in Tabasaransky District